Chandy ministry may refer to:

First Chandy ministry, the Kerala government headed by Oommen Chandy from 2004 to 2006
Second Chandy ministry, the Kerala government headed by Oommen Chandy from 2011 to 2016

See also
 Oommen Chandy